Vuzenica is a town and a municipality in northern Slovenia.  It lies on the right bank of the Drava River and extends south into the Pohorje Hills. The municipality is included in the Carinthia Statistical Region, which is in the Slovenian portion of the historical Duchy of Styria.

Municipality settlements
 Dravče (also has a riverside clustered component)
 Šentjanž nad Dravčami
 Sveti Primož na Pohorju
 Sveti Vid (also has a riverside cluster)

Vuzenica town history
Vuzenica was first mentioned as a settlement in written documents dating to 1238, but archaeological evidence points to much older settlement of the area with a Roman period burial ground in the town. Of the 13th-century castle above the settlement, only parts of the walls survive.

Vuzenica town church
The parish church in the town is dedicated to Saint Nicholas and belongs to the Roman Catholic Archdiocese of Maribor. It was built in the mid-13th century on the site of a 12th-century church. It was partly rebuilt and extended in the 14th and 15th centuries. A second church in the town is dedicated to the Virgin Mary and dates to the late 14th century.

References

External links
 Municipality of Vuzenica on Geopedia
 Vuzenica municipal site

Populated places in the Municipality of Vuzenica
Municipalities of Slovenia